Bakhriniso Babaeva (born 2 November 1997) is an Uzbekistani karateka. At the 2019 Asian Karate Championships held in Tashkent, Uzbekistan, she won the gold medal in the women's kumite 50 kg event.

Career 

At the 2017 Asian Karate Championships held in Astana, Kazakhstan, she won one of the bronze medals in the women's kumite 50 kg event. In 2018, she won the silver medal in the women's kumite 50 kg event at the Asian Games held in Jakarta, Indonesia. In the final, she lost against Gu Shiau-shuang of Chinese Taipei.

In June 2021, she competed at the World Olympic Qualification Tournament held in Paris, France hoping to qualify for the 2020 Summer Olympics in Tokyo, Japan. She was eliminated in her second match by Sara Cardin of Italy. In November 2021, she was eliminated in her third match in the women's 50 kg event at the World Karate Championships held in Dubai, United Arab Emirates.

Achievements

References 

Living people
1997 births
Place of birth missing (living people)
Uzbekistani female karateka
Karateka at the 2018 Asian Games
Medalists at the 2018 Asian Games
Asian Games medalists in karate
Asian Games silver medalists for Uzbekistan
21st-century Uzbekistani women